Nokuthula Ngwenyama (born June 16, 1976) is an American solo violist and composer of Ndebele and Japanese descent. She is a recording artist under EDI Records, and has taught at the Jacobs School of Music at Indiana University.

Background 
Sixteen-year-old Nokuthula Ngwenyama came to international attention when she won the Primrose International Viola Competition in 1993 and the Young Concert Artists International Auditions in 1994. Since then, she has been a soloist with orchestras around the world, including the Indianapolis Symphony Orchestra, Charlotte Symphony Orchestra, Atlanta Symphony Orchestra, National Symphony, Baltimore Symphony, KwaZulu-Natal Philharmonic Orchestra in Durban, and the Los Angeles Philharmonic.  She has appeared in recital at the Kennedy Center, Japan's Suntory Hall, the Louvre, and the White House.

She is an alumna of Crossroads School for Arts and Sciences in Santa Monica, CA, the Curtis Institute of Music, and attended the Conservatoire National Supérieur de Musique de Paris as a Fulbright Scholar. She also has a Master of Theological Studies degree from Harvard University.  She is a past president of the American Viola Society and director of the Primrose International Viola Competition.

References

External links 
Nokuthula Ngwenyama Artist's website
Management company website

1976 births
Living people
Curtis Institute of Music alumni
Jacobs School of Music faculty
American classical violists
Women violists
Harvard Divinity School alumni
Conservatoire de Paris alumni
American women classical composers
American classical composers
21st-century American composers
21st-century American women musicians
21st-century women composers
20th-century American musicians
20th-century American women musicians
20th-century classical musicians
American musicians of Japanese descent
20th-century violists
21st-century violists